Choice Phone LLC (also known as iConnect Guam, iCan GSM, and Wave Runner LLC) was a telecommunications company. IConnect Guam also serves Saipan, Rota and Tinian. On September 22, 2020, IT&E sign a deal that which acquired iConnect's assets, including its wireless network.

Technologies

References

External links
 Home page: https://www.iconnectguam.com/
 FCC information

Companies of Guam